Martín Manuel Calderón Sequera (born March 12, 1979) is a Mexican football manager and former player.

References

1979 births
Living people
Mexican footballers
Association football forwards
Alacranes de Durango footballers
Atlante F.C. footballers
Chiapas F.C. footballers
Club León footballers
Dorados de Sinaloa footballers
Lobos BUAP footballers
Salamanca F.C. footballers
Tampico Madero F.C. footballers
C.D. Veracruz footballers
Liga MX players
Ascenso MX players
Mexican football managers
Footballers from Veracruz
People from Veracruz (city)